Jack Keil Wolf (March 14, 1935 – May 12, 2011)  was an American researcher in information theory and coding theory.

Biography
Wolf was born in 1935 in Newark, New Jersey, and graduated from Weequahic High School in 1952. He received his undergraduate degree from the University of Pennsylvania in 1956 and his Ph.D. from Princeton University in 1960 for his thesis "On the Detection and Estimation Problem for Multiple Nonstationary Random Processes". He held faculty appointments at New York University 1963–1965, the Polytechnic Institute of Brooklyn 1965–1973 and the University of Massachusetts Amherst 1973–1984, and worked at RCA Laboratories and Bell Laboratories. In 1984, he joined the University of California, San Diego, where he applied communication and information theory to magnetic storage. He also held a part-time appointment at Qualcomm since its formation in 1985. He was president of the IEEE Information Theory Society in 1974. He died on May 12, 2011.

Awards and honors
 IEEE Fellow (1973)
 Guggenheim Fellow (1979)
 Member of the U.S. National Academy of Engineering (1993)
 IEEE Koji Kobayashi Computers and Communications Award (1998)
 Claude E. Shannon Award from the IEEE Information Theory Society (2001)
 IEEE Richard W. Hamming Medal (2004)
 Fellow of the American Academy of Arts and Sciences (2005)
 Member of the U.S. National Academy of Sciences (2010)
 Fellow of the American Association for the Advancement of Science
 Marconi Prize from and Fellow of the Marconi Society (2011)

References

External links

 
 
 Princeton alumni profiles
 
  CMRR Faculty Page
 Roberto Padovani, Paul H. Siegel, and Andrew J. Viterbi, "Jack Keil Wolf", Biographical Memoirs of the National Academy of Sciences (2014)

1935 births
2011 deaths
Fellow Members of the IEEE
Fellows of the American Academy of Arts and Sciences
American information theorists
Members of the United States National Academy of Sciences
Members of the United States National Academy of Engineering
New York University faculty
People from Newark, New Jersey
Princeton University alumni
University of California, San Diego faculty
University of Massachusetts Amherst faculty
University of Pennsylvania School of Engineering and Applied Science alumni
Weequahic High School alumni
Polytechnic Institute of New York University faculty
Fellows of the American Association for the Advancement of Science